Semenogelin-2 is a protein that in humans is encoded by the SEMG2 gene.

The secreted protein encoded by this gene is involved in the formation of a gel matrix that encases ejaculated spermatozoa. Proteolysis by the prostate-specific antigen (PSA) breaks down the gel matrix and allows the spermatozoa to move more freely. The encoded protein is found in lesser abundance than a similar semenogelin protein. The genes encoding these two semenogelin proteins are found in a cluster on chromosome 20.

See also
Semenogelin

References

Further reading